Sing for You may refer to:

Albums
Sing for You (EP) or the title song (see below), by Exo, 2015
Chad & Jeremy Sing for You, 1965
Sing for You, by the Kids from "Fame", 1983
Sing for You, by Webb Pierce, 1958

Songs
"Sing for You" (song), by Exo, 2015
"Sing for You", by Kis-My-Ft2 from Kis-My-1st, 2012
"Sing for you", by Minori Chihara from Sing All Love, 2010
"Sing for You", by Steven Curtis Chapman from Worship and Believe, 2016
"Sing for You", by Tracy Chapman from Our Bright Future, 2008